Terezín – Theresienstadt is a 2007 recital album by mezzo-soprano Anne Sofie von Otter, her regular pianist Bengt Forsberg and guests. Von Otter is accompanied by baritone Christian Gerhaher in some of the songs and Daniel Hope concludes the disc with Erwin Schulhoff's sonata for solo violin.

Overview
The album starts with Theresienstadt cabaret songs by Ilse Weber, Karel Švenk and Martin Roman (one of the very few who survived the camps), as well as classical composers Hans Krása, Viktor Ullmann, Pavel Haas, and Erwin Schulhoff.

References

2007 classical albums
Anne Sofie von Otter albums
Classical music about the Holocaust